The Merrick Mountains are a cluster of mountains, 13 km (8 mi) long, standing 11 km (7 mi) northeast of the Behrendt Mountains in Ellsworth Land, Antarctica. Discovered and photographed from the air by the Ronne Antarctic Research Expedition, 1947–1948, under Finn Ronne.

Named by US-ACAN for Conrad G. Merrick, USGS topographic engineer with the Antarctic Peninsula Traverse Party, 1961–1962, who participated in the survey of these mountains.

Features
Mount Becker
Mount Berger
Mount Boyer

See also
Mount Wasilewski

References

Mountain ranges of Ellsworth Land